Anhangabaú is a station on Line 3 (Red) of the São Paulo Metro.

References

São Paulo Metro stations
Railway stations opened in 1983
1983 establishments in Brazil
Railway stations located underground in Brazil